James Phelps may refer to:
 James Phelps (actor), English actor
 James Phelps (congressman) (1822–1900), congressman from Connecticut
Jim Phelps, fictional character in Mission:Impossible
James Phelps (musician) (1932–2010), American singer
 James I. Phelps (1875–1947), American judge in Oklahoma